The 1960 New York state election was held on November 8, 1960, to elect two judges of the New York Court of Appeals, as well as all members of the New York State Assembly and the New York State Senate.

Background
In 1959, Charles S. Desmond had been elected Chief Judge. In January 1960, Presiding Justice Sydney F. Foster, of the Appellate Division (Third Dept.), was appointed by Governor Nelson A. Rockefeller to fill temporarily the seat vacated by Desmond.

Stanley H. Fuld had been elected to the Court of Appeals in 1946. Thus his fourteen-year term would expire at the end of 1960.

Nominations
The Republican State Committee met on September 12 at Albany, New York, and re-nominated the incumbents Fuld and Foster.

The Democratic State Committee met on September 12 at Albany, New York, and endorsed the incumbent Republican Stanley H. Fuld for re-election, and nominated Supreme Court Justice Henry L. Ughetta for the other vacancy.

On September 13, the Liberal Party endorsed the Republican/Democratic nominee Fuld, and nominated Supreme Court Justice Benjamin Brenner for the other vacancy. On September 18, Brenner declined to run. On September 19, the Liberals also endorsed the other Republican nominee Foster.

Result

The incumbents Fuld and Foster were re-elected.

Obs.: Fuld's total vote was 6,939,113.

Sources
Official result: LIBERAL AID HERE WON FOR KENNEDY; Without the Party's 406,167 Votes, He Would Have Lost, Official Canvass Shows in NYT on December 13, 1960 (subscription required)

Notes

Totals from New York State Red Book 1961

See also
New York state elections
1960 United States presidential election

 

1960
1960
 
New York